Bill Budge's Raster Blaster (or Rasterblaster on the disk label) is a pioneering home computer pinball simulation written by Bill Budge for the Apple II and published in 1981 by Budge's company, BudgeCo. It was ported to the Atari 8-bit family. Raster Blaster resembles the Williams Firepower table from 1980.

While not the first pinball game for home computers, Raster Blaster set a higher bar for visual fidelity, and the next several years saw a flurry of Apple II pinball titles: David's Midnight Magic (1982), Night Mission Pinball (1982), and Budge's own Pinball Construction Set (1983).

Reception

Debuting in April 1981, the game sold 25,000 copies by June 1982, tied for fourth on Computer Gaming Worlds list of top sellers. BYTE praised the game's realistic physics, writing that "Most microcomputer games that are versions of existing board or equipment games aren't worth the disks they're printed on, but Raster Blaster does not fall into that category!" 

Raster Blaster was voted Softalk magazine's Most Popular Program of 1981.

Softline stated when reviewing David's Midnight Magic that it "ratifies Bill Budge's extraordinary program as a programming tour de force" and "proof of Budge's technical lead over his rivals", as Midnight was merely equal to Raster Blaster despite being nine months ("an eternity in the Apple II world") newer.

Compute! called the Atari version "addictive", although it noted some bugs.

References

External links
Interview with Bill Budge

1981 video games
Apple II games
Atari 8-bit family games
Pinball video games
Video games developed in the United States